Mufti Muhammad Khalid Balti (alias Muhammad Khurasani) (1969-1971 - January 2022) was a central spokesman of Tehrik-i-Taliban Pakistan. He belonged to Gilgit-Baltistan. He died in January 2022, and was aged between 48 and 50.

References

20th-century births
Year of birth missing
2022 deaths
People from Gilgit-Baltistan
Tehrik-i-Taliban Pakistan members